Fully Automated Installation is a group of Shell and Perl scripts that install and configure a complete Linux distribution quickly on a large number of computers.

FAI currently only allows for installing Debian and Ubuntu distributions, but, since it is open source, it can be adapted to install other operating systems. This has already been done for CentOS, Red Hat, and Scientific Linux Cern.

Similar software exists for Red Hat (kickstart), SuSE (YaST and alice), Solaris (Jumpstart) and likely other operating systems.

References

External links 
 Official website

System administration
Network management